The Permanent Secretary (Danish: Departementschef) is the most senior civil servant of a Danish Government ministry, charged with running the department on a day-to-day basis.

Permanent Secretaries in office
Permanent Secretaries currently in office are:

References

Government occupations
Civil service of Denmark